Gasparrini is a surname. Notable people with the surname include:

 Guglielmo Gasparrini (1803–1866), Italian botanist and mycologist
 Rino Gasparrini (born 1992), Italian cyclist
 Vito Gasparrini (born 1975), Venezuelan model

Italian-language surnames